The Campa (Kampa) or Campan (Kampan) languages, a.k.a. Pre-Andine Maipurean / Arawakan, are closely related Arawakan languages of the Peruvian Amazon.

Languages
The Glottolog uses the term Pre-Andine for this group of languages and classifies them as follows, based on classifications by Michael (2011) and Pedrós:

 Nomatsigenga
 Asha-Ashe-Kak-Matsi-Nan
 Matsi-Nan
 Matsigenka
 Nanti
 Asha-Ashe-Kak
 Caquinte
 Ashe-Asha
 Asháninka
 Ashéninka
 Ashéninka Pajonal
 South Ucayali Ashéninka
 Ashe-Asha Norte
 Ashéninka Perené
 Pichis Ashéninka
 Aiyíninka Apurucayali
 Ucayali-Yurúa Ashéninka

There are grammars for Ashéninka Perené, Nanti, Aiyíninka Apurucayali, and Caquinte.

References